High Ledges is a wildlife sanctuary located in Shelburne, Massachusetts.  The  property, located on the northern portion of Massaemett Mountain, is owned by Massachusetts Audubon Society.

One of the highlights of the sanctuary is the vista known as High Ledge.  The cliff overlooks Shelburne Falls and areas to the west, including Mount Greylock.

External links 
 High Ledges - Mass Audubon
 High Ledge - FranklinSites.com Hiking Guide
  Favorite Places: High Ledges Wildlife Sanctuary Rich in Orchids, Ferns - MassLive

Protected areas of Franklin County, Massachusetts
Open space reserves of Massachusetts
Massachusetts Audubon Society
Shelburne, Massachusetts